Aquila d'Arroscia is a comune (municipality) in the Province of Imperia in the Italian region Liguria, located about  southwest of Genoa and about  north of Imperia.

Aquila d'Arroscia borders the following municipalities: Alto, Borghetto d'Arroscia, Caprauna, Nasino, Onzo, and Ranzo.

References

Cities and towns in Liguria
Articles which contain graphical timelines